Containerboard or corrugated case material (CCM) is a type of paperboard specially manufactured for the production of corrugated board. It includes both linerboard and corrugating medium (or fluting), the two types of paper that make up corrugated board. Since containerboard is made mainly out of natural unbleached wood fibers, it is generally brown, although its shade may vary depending on the type of wood, pulping process, recycling rate and impurities content. For certain boxes that demand good presentation, white bleached pulp or coating is used on the top ply of the linerboard that goes outside the box.

Manufacture

Containerboard is made on modified paper machines that can handle higher grammages.

The production of containerboard is the highest of all kinds of paper in the world. More than 100 million tons are produced annually. It is made in specialized paper machines from virgin as well as recycled fibers. Linerboard made of virgin pulp is called kraftliner, whereas recycled linerboard is known as testliner. The corrugating medium may be recycled medium, called wellenstoff in Europe, or virgin, which is called semichemical medium for the type of pulp used in its production. The borders of these categories becomes blurred when both virgin and recycled fibers are used in making one product. 

At the end of the manufacturing process containerboard is cut into rolls comprising a continuous sheet of paper, which will later be unwound in the corrugator machine while making the corrugated board.

See also
Corrugated fiberboard

Paper
Paperboard